Brian's Winter is a 1996 young adult novel by Gary Paulsen. It is the third novel in the Hatchet series, but second in terms of chronology as an alternate ending sequel to Hatchet.

It was also released as Hatchet: Winter by Pan Macmillan on February 9, 1996.

Background
At the end of Hatchet, thirteen-year-old Brian Robeson, who has been trapped in the Canadian wilderness after a plane accident, decides to dive for a "survival pack" from the submerged aircraft. He almost drowns trying to tear the plane open. He recovers, among other things, an emergency transmitter.  Within hours, a pilot receives the beacon and rescues him. The book ends with a note that Brian, who learned wilderness survival through trial and error, probably would not have survived the upcoming harsh winter on his own.

Paulsen says that many readers wrote to him, complaining about the deus ex machina ending.  In response, Paulsen wrote Brian's Winter, which explores what would have happened if Brian had not activated the transmitter.

Plot summary
The story deals with Brian, still stranded at the L-shaped lake during the fall and winter, constructing a winter shelter, building snow shoes, being confronted by a bear, befriending and naming a skunk and learning how to make a bow more powerful.  Eventually, Brian meets a family of Cree trappers, the Smallhorns, who help him return home.

Continuity with series
Brian's Winter is followed chronologically by the two sequels, Brian's Return and Brian's Hunt as they recognize the book as a series canon. The River does not and includes no mention that the events of Brian's Winter ever took place as Brian tells Derek Holtzer that he only spent fifty-four days in the wilderness. This is because The River was published in 1991, five years before the release of Brian's Winter.

References

1996 American novels
American young adult novels
Novels by Gary Paulsen
Novels about survival skills
Novels set in Canada